The 2009–10 Inter-Provincial Limited Over Tournament was the second season of the official Limited overs domestic cricket competition in Sri Lanka. Six teams in total, five representing four provinces of Sri Lanka and a Sri Lanka Cricket team participating in the competition. The competition began on 6 February 2010 when Ruhuna elevens played the Sri Lanka Cricket Combined XI at Galle International Stadium, in Galle.

This season comprised 15 regular matches, two semi finals and a grand final.

Teams

Stadiums

Rules and regulations

Teams received 5 points for a win, 2 for a tie or no result, and 0 for a loss. At the end of the regular matches the teams ranked two and three play each other in the preliminary final. The winner of the preliminary final earns the right to play the first placed team in the final at the home venue of the first placed team.  In the event of several teams finishing with the same number of points, standings are determined by most wins, then net run rate (NRR).

Standings and tournament progression

Standings

Full table on cricinfo
<div style="font-size:95%">(C) = Eventual Champion; (R) = Runner-up.

Tournament progression

Fixtures

Round 1

Round 2

Round 3

Round 4

Round 5

Knockout stage

Semi Final 1

Semi Final 2

Final

Statistics

Awards
 Man of the Tournament – Kaushalya Weeraratne: 371 runs (411 balls), highest score of 143 (158 balls) (Kandurata)
 Batsman of the Tournament – Upul Tharanga: 292 runs (412 balls), highest score of 93 (135 balls) (Ruhuna)
 Bowler of the Tournament – Sachithra Senanayake: 14 wickets (57.1 overs), best innings bowling of 4/30 (8.1 overs) (Ruhuna)

Most Runs
The top five highest run scorers (total runs) in the season are included in this table.

Last Updated 10 January 2011.

Most Wickets
The following table contains the five leading wicket-takers of the season.

Last Updated 10 January 2011.

Highest Team Totals
The following table lists the six highest team scores during this season.

Last Updated 10 January 2011.

Highest Scores
This table contains the top five highest scores of the season made by a batsman in a single innings.

Last Updated 10 January 2011.

Best Bowling Figures
This table lists the top five players with the best bowling figures in the season.

Last Updated 10 January 2011.

Media coverage

References

External links
 Tournament Page – Cricinfo

2010 in Sri Lankan cricket
Sri Lankan domestic cricket competitions
Domestic cricket competitions in 2009–10